Glen Collins may refer to:

 Glen Collins (footballer) (born 1977), New Zealand association football player
 Glen Collins (American football) (born 1959), former American football player